Amal International School (AIS) is an international school in Colombo, Sri Lanka. It was founded in 1991, as a social service project to develop and expand education in national curriculum with the medium of instruction in English.  Amal International School is attended by students ranging from Preschool to Advanced Level.

Location 
The school is located in the Western Province of Sri Lanka.
Amal international school is in Dharmarama road, Off Havelock Road, Colombo 00600.

Studies and Annual Events 
Amal International School currently follows the national curriculum, set by the Ministry of Education. The school is conducting extracurricular activities such as:
 The annual award ceremony
 Educational tours
 Basketball
 Sports day

See also 

 Education in Sri Lanka
 List of schools in Sri Lanka
 List of international schools in Sri Lanka

References

External links 
 

International schools in Sri Lanka
Schools in Colombo